Intelligence Corps can refer to:

Intelligence Corps (United Kingdom)
Military Intelligence Corps (United States Army)
Directorate of Military Intelligence (Ireland)
New Zealand Intelligence Corps
Australian Army Intelligence Corps
Canadian Intelligence Corps
Israeli Intelligence Corps